Blackout Wednesday (also known as  Drinksgiving) refers to  binge drinking on the night before the Thanksgiving holiday in the United States. Very few people work on Thanksgiving, and most college students are home with their families  for the Thanksgiving holiday, which means that high school friends can catch up at the local tavern as they converge on their hometown.  

"Blacking out" is a slang term for unconsciousness and/or memory loss due to excessive alcohol intoxication. In some suburbs of Chicago like Highwood and Naperville (where some places remove all bar stools for the night), Blackout Wednesday can be a more popular party night than even New Year's Eve or Saint Patrick's Day. Rockford, Illinois, about ninety minutes from Chicago, also has a robust Blackout Wednesday party crowd every year. 

In some cities, it is the worst drunk driving night of the year. Police departments increase patrols checking for drunk driving in many jurisdictions including in Indiana and Minnesota. MADD reports that the Thanksgiving holiday produces more people killed in drunk driving crashes than the Christmas holiday.

The name "Drinksgiving" dates to 2007. The concept itself is believed to have originated decades before the names.

References

Alcohol abuse in the United States
Drinking culture
Wednesday observances
Observances based on the date of Thanksgiving (United States)